Shir Ali Beyk Mahalleh (also Romanized as Shīr ‘Alī Beyk Maḩalleh) is a village in Machian Rural District, Kelachay District, Rudsar County, Gilan Province, Iran. At the 2006 census, its population was 40, in 13 families.

References 

Populated places in Rudsar County